Aliaksei Vasilevich Katkavets (born 7 June 1998) is a Belarusian track and field athlete competing in the javelin throw. He competed in the men's javelin throw event at the 2020 Summer Olympics held in Tokyo, Japan. In 2019, he competed in the men's javelin throw at the 2019 World Athletics Championships in Doha, Qatar. He did not qualify to compete in the final.

In 2019, he won the bronze medal in the men's javelin throw at the 2019 European Athletics U23 Championships held in Gävle, Sweden.

References

External links 

 

Living people
1998 births
Place of birth missing (living people)
Belarusian male javelin throwers
World Athletics Championships athletes for Belarus
Athletes (track and field) at the 2020 Summer Olympics
Olympic athletes of Belarus
Olympic male javelin throwers